Municipal Stadium is a multi-use stadium in Curtea de Argeş, Romania. It serves mostly for football matches and had been the home ground of Internaţional Curtea de Argeş. The stadium holds up to 7,500 people.

 Recently, the field grass has been replaced.

Football venues in Romania
Curtea de Argeș